Krakow University of Economics  (Polish: Uniwersytet Ekonomiczny w Krakowie, UEK) is one of the five Polish public economics universities. CUE came into existence in 1925. It is the biggest university of economic sciences in Poland. Kraków University of Economics is one of the three largest universities in Kraków, after Jagiellonian University and the AGH University of Science and Technology. The motto and mission of the university in Latin is "Rerum cognoscere causas et valorem" (in English "To learn the causes and values of things. To provide universal education. To bring together professional and general knowledge of methodological and theoretical character.") Its  campus is in the vicinity of historical medieval Old Town of Kraków and easily accessible both on foot or by public transportation. In addition to the main campus in Kraków, the university has seven Remote Teaching Centers in the cities of the region.

History

The university opened its doors on October 1, 1925, as College of Commerce (Wyższe Studium Handlowe).

On 6 November 1939, as a part of Sonderaktion Krakau operation, the Nazis arrested professors of Cracow universities who later were executed or sent to concentration camps. Among them were four professors of the academy: Arnold Bolland, Zygmunt Sarna, Walenty Winid and Albin Żabiński, as well as many professors of other universities who were running some classes at the academy. Two buildings of the school were seized, and numerous library books and documents were lost. Classes continued surreptitiously throughout the war, until the school was able to reopen in 1945. The school was nationalized in 1950 and renamed as Higher School of Economics (Wyższa Szkoła Ekonomiczna).

In 1974 it was renamed again, as Kraków Academy of Economics (Akademia Ekonomiczna w Krakowie). In 2007 it received its current name: Cracow University of Economics (Uniwersytet Ekonomiczny w Krakowie).

Degrees
Kraków University of Economics has national rights to admit:
 licencjat  – 1st degree
 inżynier – Engineer degree in 2 majors
 Magister – European master's degree in 11 majors
 MBA degree – in cooperation with foreign universities
 MPA degree – in cooperation with foreign universities
 doktor nauk- PhD in 3 disciplines: economics, management and commodity sciences
 doktor habilitowany – Habilitation degree (post doc degree) in 3 disciplines: economics, management and commodity sciences

Structure and organization

Faculties

Faculty of Economics and International Relations
Chair of Macroeconomics
Chair of Microeconomics
Chair of International Economics
Chair of Theory of Economics
Chair of European Economic Integration (Jean Monnet European Centre of Excellence)
Chair of European Studies
Chair of Foreign Trade
Chair of International Management
Chair of Human Capital Management
Chair of Economic Policy and Development Programming
Chair of Public Management and Administration
Chair of Entrepreneurship and Innovation
Chair of Strategic Analyses
Chair of Economics for Real Estate and Investment Process
Chair of Economic and Social History (UNESCO Chair for Heritage and Urban Studies)
Chair of History of Economic Thought
Chair of Political Science
Chair of Philosophy
Chair of Sociology
Chair of Psychology and Education
Chair of Organisation Strategy and Development
Chair of International and Comparative Law
Chair of Public Law
Faculty of Finance
Chair of Finance
Chair of Corporate Finance
Chair of Regional Economy
Chair of Mathematics
Chair of Industrial Policy and Ecology
Chair of Law
Chair of Financial Accounting
Chair of Financial Markets
Chair of Insurance
Chair of Household Economics
Faculty of Commodity Science
Chair of Chemistry and Process Kinetics
Chair of Applied Economics
Chair of Metrology and Instrumental Analysis
Chair of Commodity Microbiology
Chair of Product Packaging
Chair of Product Technology and Ecology
Chair of Industrial Commodity Science
Chair of Foodstuffs Commodity Science
Chair of Quality Management
Faculty of Management
Chair of Market Analysis and Marketing Research
Chair of Consumption Research
Chair of Econometrics
Chair of Economics and Corporate Organisation
Chair of Commerce and Market Institutions
Chair of Information Technology
Chaor of Computational Systems
Chair of Marketing
Chair of Organisation and Management Methods
Chair of Management Process
Chair of Accounting
Chair of Statistics
Chair of Management Strategy
Chair of Tourism
Chair of Organisational Behaviour
Chair of Human Resources Management

Additional
Kraków University of Economics Museum

Study
There are about 20,000 students (full- and part-time). The university offers 13 majors and 38 specializations within the majors taught in the Polish language. CUE offers also studies in the English language. The university offers plenty of postgraduate courses and studies as well as MBA programs in cooperation with foreign universities.

The studies in the Polish language are realized on the following majors:
economics  (B.Sc., M.Sc.)
administration (B.A.)
public management and administration (B.A.)
international relations (B.A., M.A.)
international economics  (B.Sc., M.Sc.)
management  (B.Sc., M.Sc.)
management and production engineering (B.Sc.)
commodity science  (B.Sc., M.Sc.)
European studies (B.A.)
finance and accountancy  (B.Sc., M.Sc.)
spatial management  (B.Sc., M.Sc.)
tourism and recreation (B.A.)
IT studies and econometrics (B.Sc., M.Sc.)
marketing and market communication (B.Sc., M.Sc.)

Studies in the English language are realized on the following majors:
international business (B.Sc., M.Sc.)
corporate finance and accountancy (B.Sc., M.Sc.)
public management and administration (M.A.)

Kraków University of Economics offers also PhD studies in the following disciplines:
in Polish: economics, management, commodity science
in German: economics, management

Periodical publications in English 
 Rector's Lectures
 Argumenta Oeconomica Cracoviensia
 EMERGO – Journal of Transforming Economies and Societies
 Wiki Encyclopedia of Management "M-files"

Affiliation
Kraków University of Economics is member of many international organizations and networks, such as:
European University Association (EUA)
International Council for Open and Distance Education (ICDE)
Danube Rectors' Conference (DRC)
Network of International Business and Economic Schools (NIBES)
European Master of Business Studies (EMBS)
European Business Consortium (EBC)
International Education Knowledge Network (IEKN)
US Department of State-Affiliated Overseas Educational Advising Centers
SOCRATES-ERASMUS
Central European Exchange Program for University Studies (CEEPUS)

Notable alumni and faculty

Rafał Brzoska (born 1977), entrepreneur, founder and owner of InPost
Andrzej Gut-Mostowy (born 1960), politician and economist
Jerzy Hausner (born 1949), politician and economist
Jacek Purchla (born 1954), economist and historian
Aleksander Surdej (born 1961), economist and diplomat
Dariusz Szwed (born 1967), politician, feminist, social activist and economist
Beata Szydło (born 1963), ethnologist, politician, former Prime Minister of Poland
Sobiesław Zasada (born 1930), rally driver and economist

References

External links

 English Website of CUE
 Website for Incoming Students (Studies in English)
 About CUE – Overview

 
Universities and colleges in Kraków
Universities of economics in Europe
Business schools in Poland
Educational institutions established in 1925
1925 establishments in Poland